Airspeed is a 1998 Canadian disaster thriller film directed by Robert TinLul and starring Elisha Cuthbert. It was distributed by Lions Gate Entertainment & Melenny Productions. In the film, the passengers and crew of a private jet are incapacitated by an explosive decompression, except for the teenage daughter of the owner of the private jet. Their survival depends on her.

Cast

 Elisha Cuthbert as Nicole Stone
 Joe Mantegna as Raymond Stone
 Roc Lafortune as Captain Lopez
 Bronwên Booth as Andrea Prescott
 Lynne Adams as Marylin Stone
 Russell Yuen as Mark
 Gordon Masten as Frank
 Don Jordan as Pilot Greg
 Martin Lacroix as Co-Pilot Terry
 Yvan Ponton as Lee 'Bickster' Biquette
 Charles Powell as Jeff, A.T.C.
 Larry Day as Donovan

Reception
Jon Weber of Bad Movie Night was critical of the production values, comparing the film to television afterschool specials. Weber panned the film saying "This is really bad, worthy of outright heckling."

References

External links
 
 

1998 films
1990s disaster films
1998 independent films
1990s thriller drama films
Canadian aviation films
Canadian coming-of-age drama films
Canadian disaster films
Canadian independent films
English-language Canadian films
1990s English-language films
Films about aviation accidents or incidents
Films about children
Films about families
Films scored by Normand Corbeil
Survival films
1998 thriller films
1998 drama films
1990s Canadian films